Pointe Coupee Parish ( or) is a parish located in the U.S. state of Louisiana. As of the 2020 census, the population was 20,758. The parish seat is New Roads.

Pointe Coupee Parish is part of the Baton Rouge, Louisiana Metropolitan Statistical Area. In 2010, the center of population of Louisiana was located in Pointe Coupee Parish, in the city of New Roads.

History

Pointe Coupee is the oldest settlement on the lower Mississippi, having been made by some wandering Canadian trappers as early as 1708. Bienville established this place as a military post, before the commencement of New Orleans. The fort was moved in 1722 to an area near the present St. Francisville Ferry landing.

After several floods, Governor Luis de Unzaga in 1772 moved the European settlement to a new post, the so-called Post Unzaga. Recently, historians Cazorla and Polo, from the Louis de Unzaga Historical Society research team, using satellite remote sensing techniques and comparative plans from the General Archive of the Indies, have managed to locate the position of the Unzaga post, which included, along with it, a parish. After the slave rebellion of 1795 this settlement was left uninhabited. 
Pointe Coupee Parish (originally and  recently, informally pronounced pwahnt coo-pay) was organized by European Americans in 1805 as part of the Territory of Orleans (statehood for Louisiana followed in 1812).  It was originally called Pointe Coupee County, and was one of the original 12 counties of the Territory of Orleans.  It was renamed as Pointe Coupee Parish in 1816.  The original Pointe Coupee Parish included parts of present-day Iberville and West Baton Rouge Parishes.  There were minor boundary adjustments with neighboring parishes up through 1852, when its boundaries stabilized.

In 2008, Pointe Coupee was one of the communities that suffered the most damage by Hurricane Gustav.

Geography
The land consists mainly of prairies and backswamp.

Major highways
Pointe Coupee Parish has 498.98 miles of highways within its borders.

  U.S. Highway 190
  Louisiana Highway 1
  Louisiana Highway 10
  Louisiana Highway 15
  Louisiana Highway 77
  Louisiana Highway 78
  Louisiana Highway 81
  Louisiana Highway 411
  Louisiana Highway 413
  Louisiana Highway 414
  Louisiana Highway 415
  Louisiana Highway 416
  Louisiana Highway 417
  Louisiana Highway 418
  Louisiana Highway 419
  Louisiana Highway 420
  Louisiana Highway 970
  Louisiana Highway 971
  Louisiana Highway 972
  Louisiana Highway 973
  Louisiana Highway 975
  Louisiana Highway 976
  Louisiana Highway 977
  Louisiana Highway 978
  Louisiana Highway 979
  Louisiana Highway 981
  Louisiana Highway 982
  Louisiana Highway 983
  Louisiana Highway 984
  Louisiana Highway 3050
  Louisiana Highway 3091
  Louisiana Highway 3131
  Louisiana Highway 3190

Major waterways
 Atchafalaya River
 False River
 Mississippi River
 Old River
 Raccourci Old River (not a river but an oxbow lake)
 Red River

Adjacent parishes
 Concordia Parish  (north)
 West Feliciana Parish  (northeast)
 West Baton Rouge Parish  (east)
 Iberville Parish  (south)
 St. Martin Parish  (southwest)
 St. Landry Parish  (west)
 Avoyelles Parish  (northwest)

National protected area
 Atchafalaya National Wildlife Refuge (part)

Communities

City
 New Roads (parish seat)

Towns
 Fordoche
 Livonia

Village
 Morganza

Census-designated place
 Ventress

Unincorporated communities

 Aline
 Allon
 Alma
 Anchor
 Argyle
 Bayou Latenache
 Batchelor
 Beaud
 Blanks
 Brooks
 Brownview
 Chenal
 Columbo
 Coon
 Dupont
 False River
 East Krotz Springs
 Elliot City
 Frisco
 Frogmore
 Glynn
 Hermitage
 Ingleside
 Innis
 Island
 Jacoby
 Jarreau
 Keller
 Knapp
 LaBarre
 Lacour
 Lakeland
 Leavel
 Legonier
 Lettsworth
 Lottie
 Major
 McCrea
 McKneeley
 Mix
 Morrison
 New California
 New Texas
 Oscar
 Parlange
 Patin
 Point Coupee
 Quinton
 Ravenswood
 Red Cross
 Red River Landing
 Rougon
 Seibert
 Schwabs
 Sherburne
 Shexnayder
 Smithland
 Sparks
 St. Dizier
 Torbert
 Torras
 Valverda
 Waterloo
 Wickliffe
 Williamsport

Demographics

As of the census of 2000, there were 22,763 people, 8,397 households, and 6,171 families residing in the parish. There were 10,297 housing units at an average density of 18 per square mile (7/km2). The racial makeup of the parish was 68.91% White, 29.61% Black or African American, 0.17% Native American, 0.25% Asian, 0.32% from other races, and 0.56% from two or more races.  1.08% of the population were Hispanic or Latino of any race. 93.61% of the population spoke only English at home, while 4.89% spoke French or Cajun French, 0.96% spoke Spanish, and 0.73% spoke Louisiana Creole French.

By the publication of the 2020 United States census, there were 20,758 people, 8,960 households, and 5,625 families residing in the parish, reflecting a slight population decline. Among the population in 2020, the racial and ethnic makeup of the parish was 58.99% non-Hispanic white, 34.79% Black or African American, 0.18% Native American, 0.29% Asian, 0.01% Pacific Islander, 2.74% other or multiracial, and 3.01% Hispanic or Latino of any race.

In 2000, the median income for a household in the parish was $30,618, and the median income for a family was $36,625. Males had a median income of $35,022 versus $20,759 for females. The per capita income for the parish was $15,387, ranking 23rd out of 64 parishes.  About 18.70% of families and 23.10% of the population were below the poverty line, including 30.20% of those under age 18 and 23.90% are the age of 65 and older.

Religiously, Christianity is the dominant religion being part of the Bible Belt. The largest denomination by membership as of 2020 has been the Catholic Church (according to the Association of Religion Data Archives). Southern Baptists were the second largest denomination by membership.

Economy

Nan Ya Plastics Corporation America has a large plant near Batchelor. Another large employer is NRG / Big Cajun 1 & 2 power plants near New Roads. The parish's economy is heavily reliant upon agriculture, with sugar cane being one of the main cash crops.

Education

Primary and secondary schools
The Pointe Coupee Parish School Board serves the parish. As of 2014 the sole secondary school operated by the parish school board is Livonia High School, serving grades 7 through 12.  Pointe Coupee Central High School was closed down in 2014. Current public schools include Stem Magnet Academy, Valverda Elementary, Rougon, Rosenwald, and Upper Pointe Coupee Elementary.

 Private
 Catholic Elementary of Pointe Coupee / Catholic High School of Pointe Coupee (of the Roman Catholic Diocese of Baton Rouge)
 False River Academy

The parish is in the service area of South Louisiana Community College.

National Guard
A Co of the 769th BEB (Brigade Engineer Battalion) is an Engineer Company (Combat) that  resides in New Roads, Louisiana.  This unit is part of the 256TH IBCT and deployed to Iraq in 2004-5 and 2010.

Law enforcement

The Pointe Coupee Sheriff's Office is the chief law enforcement agency in Pointe Coupee Parish.  The sheriff's office is responsible for routine law enforcement patrols in the parish.  There are several divisions besides the road patrol, including the parish prison, a water patrol, a mounted horse patrol, an aviation unit, a criminal investigations division, and bailiffs for the courthouse. This department employs over 100 full-time deputies, as well as several part-time deputies. The department's main office is located in the parish courthouse in New Roads.

Notable residents
 Lindy Boggs (1916-2013) – U.S. Representative from Louisiana's 2nd congressional district and U.S. Ambassador to the Holy See. She was a Dame of the Orders of Malta, St. Lazarus and Holy Sepulchre as well as the Pian Order.
 Brian J. Costello, native and lifelong resident of New Roads is a humanitarian author of more than two dozen books on local, Louisiana, European and religious studies and is a lay tertiary of the Mercedarian order and a knight of the Equestrian Order of the Holy Sepulchre and the Royal Brotherhood of the Order of Saint Michael of the Wing.
 Emmitt Douglas (1926–1981) – president of the Louisiana NAACP from 1966 to 1981, resided in New Roads from 1949 to 1981
 Ernest Gaines – author
 Clark Gaudin - former state representative from East Baton Rouge Parish
 Buddy Guy - Singer
 Gwendolyn Midlo Hall, historian, did extensive research and writing about slavery in Louisiana, having discovered important documentation of the slave trade and individual slaves that provided new understanding of African-American history in Louisiana, including the specific ethnic origins in various African cultures of many slaves
 Russel L. Honoré - retired Lieutenant General, U.S. Army
 J. Thomas Jewell - state representative 1936–1968; Speaker of the Louisiana House 1960-1964
 J. E. Jumonville, Jr. - state senator from District 17, 1976–1992, horse breeder
 J. E. Jumonville, Sr. - state senator, 1968–1976, natural gas developer
 Catherine D. Kimball - former Chief Justice of Louisiana Supreme Court; former judge of the Louisiana 18th Judicial District Court, 1983-1993
 Major General John Archer Lejeune, career military officer and Commandant of the United States Marine Corps.
 Norma McCorvey - anonymous plaintiff in 1973 U.S. Supreme Court landmark abortion case, Roe v. Wade.
 deLesseps Story Morrison (1912–1964), born in New Roads, was elected four times as mayor of New Orleans, serving from 1946 to 1962; he ran unsuccessfully three times for governor of Louisiana. He was also the United States ambassador to the Organization of American States.
 Jacob Haight Morrison, (1905-1974), New Roads native, became a journalist, politician and preservationist, helping protect the French Quarter of New Orleans.
 Charles Parlange - former Chief Justice of Louisiana Supreme Court
 Julien Poydras – territorial U.S. Representative for Louisiana; 1st State Senate President, philanthropist
 William Priestley (1771-1838), son of the famous English chemist and philosopher Joseph Priestley, who emigrated to America in 1793 and eventually bought a sugar plantation in Pointe Coupee Parish around 1805, where he lived the rest of his life with his family; his son, William Jr., was elected to the Louisiana House of Representatives from the same parish.
 James Ryder Randall -  poet, teacher at Poydras Academy, 1856–1860, wrote "Maryland, My Maryland" while living in Pointe Coupée Parish
 Nauman Scott - judge of the United States District Court for the Western District of Louisiana, based in Alexandria
 Major Thibaut - state representative for District 18 since 2008; First Parish President
 H. C. Tounoir - former state representative
 Chris Williams - offensive tackle for the St. Louis Rams
 Clyde Kimball - former State Representative and former deputy secretary of the Louisiana Department of Wildlife and Fisheries

Politics
Prior to 2008, Pointe Coupee Parish was a Democratic stronghold in presidential elections, only failing to back the party's nominees four times between 1912 and 2004 even as the South began trending more Republican in presidential elections. Since 2008 it has consistently supported Republican nominees.

See also
 National Register of Historic Places listings in Pointe Coupee Parish, Louisiana
 Pointe Coupee Parish Sheriff's Office

References

External links

 Pointe Coupee Interactive Map
 Official Pointe Coupee Parish website
 Gwendolyn Midlo Hall, "THE LOUISIANA SLAVE DATABASE AND THE LOUISIANA FREE DATABASE: 1719-1820", iBiblio website
 Official Pointe Coupee Parish Sheriff's Office website
 Explore the History and Culture of Southeastern Louisiana, a National Park Service Discover Our Shared Heritage Travel Itinerary
 Pointe Coupee at the Millennium Documentary Photography Project

 
Louisiana parishes
Parishes in Acadiana
Acadiana
Baton Rouge metropolitan area
1807 establishments in the United States
Louisiana parishes on the Mississippi River